Keith Newton PA (born 10 April 1952) is an English prelate of the Catholic Church. On 15 January 2011, Newton was named as the first ordinary of the Personal Ordinariate of Our Lady of Walsingham. Prior to his reception into the Catholic Church in 2011, An Anglican episcopal convert to Catholicism, Newton had been a priest and bishop of the Church of England; his last Anglican office was as Bishop of Richborough in the Province of Canterbury from 2002 to 31 December 2010.

Anglican ministry
Newton studied divinity at King's College London and went on to earn a Postgraduate Certificate in Education at Christ Church College Canterbury before completing his theological studies as an Anglican ordinand at St Augustine's College, Canterbury.

Newton held the following positions in the Church of England:
 1975-1978, Curate of Great Ilford St Mary, Chelmsford
 1978-1985, Team vicar at St Matthew's Wimbledon in the Wimbledon Team Ministry, Southwark
 1985-1991, Rector of Blantyre, Malawi, and then Dean of Blantyre Cathedral
 1991-1993, Priest-in-charge of Holy Nativity Knowle, Bristol
 1993-2001, Vicar of Holy Nativity Knowle, Bristol
 1997-2001, Priest-in-charge of All Hallows, Easton

From 1995 to 1998, Newton was Rural Dean of Brislington. From 1998 to 2001 he was area dean of the new deanery of Bristol South.

On 7 March 2002, Newton was consecrated as an Anglican bishop by George Carey, the then Archbishop of Canterbury. Newton was subsequently Bishop of Richborough and a provincial episcopal visitor for the Province of Canterbury in 2002.  He held this post until 31 December 2010.

Ordination in the Catholic Church

In 2008, Newton met officials of the Congregation for the Doctrine of the Faith to discuss the possibility of joining the Catholic Church.
arg
On 8 November 2010, Newton announced his intention to leave the Church of England at the end of the year in order to join the proposed personal ordinariates of the Catholic Church for former Anglicans.

Newton was received into the Catholic Church on 1 January 2011, at Westminster Cathedral, with his wife Gill, by Bishop Alan Hopes. Also received at the same ceremony were Andrew Burnham (former Bishop of Ebbsfleet), John Broadhurst (former Bishop of Fulham) and his wife Judith, and three former sisters of the Society of Saint Margaret in Walsingham – Sister Carolyne Joseph, Sister Jane Louise and Sister Wendy Renate. On 13 January 2011, he was ordained by Bishop Hopes to the diaconate with the two other former Church of England bishops, Andrew Burnham and John Broadhurst.  Two days later, on 15 January 2011, they were ordained to the priesthood by Vincent Nichols, Archbishop of Westminster, in Westminster Cathedral. On this date Pope Benedict XVI appointed Newton the first ordinary of the Personal Ordinariate of Our Lady of Walsingham in England and Wales. As a married man, according to its canon law, the Catholic Church did not permit his consecration as a bishop but it was possible for him to be ordained a priest as a former Anglican cleric.

On 17 March 2011, it was announced that Pope Benedict XVI had granted Newton the title of protonotary apostolic (the highest ranking non-episcopal honorific title for Catholic clergy and the highest grade of monsignor). Although Newton, as ordinary, does not have an episcopal ministry, he has been granted the use of pontificals (including the mitre, pectoral cross, episcopal ring and crozier etc.) by the Holy See in the same manner as some abbots.

Newton became a cruise chaplain with seafarers' welfare charity Apostleship of the Sea in 2014.

Personal life
Newton is married to Gill, a teacher, with whom he has three adult children – Lucy, Tom and James.

Styles
Mr Keith Newton (1952-1975)
The Reverend Keith Newton (1975-1986)
The Very Reverend Keith Newton  (1986-2002)
The Right Reverend Keith Newton (2002-2010)
Mr Keith Newton (1-13 January 2011)
The Reverend Keith Newton (13-15 January 2011)
The Right Reverend Keith Newton (15 January - 17 March 2011)
The Right Reverend Monsignor Keith Newton PA (2011–present)

References

1952 births
Living people
Alumni of the Theological Department of King's College London
Bishops of Richborough
Associates of King's College London
Anglican suffragan bishops in the Diocese of Canterbury
Apostolic pronotaries
Alumni of St Augustine's College, Canterbury
Anglican bishop converts to Roman Catholicism
21st-century English Roman Catholic priests
Married Roman Catholic clergy
People of the personal ordinariates
English Anglo-Catholics
Anglo-Catholic bishops
Clergy from Liverpool
People from Walsingham